Zeit² (also known as Zeit Squared) is a scrolling shooter shoot 'em up made by German developer Brightside Games, which was released for Microsoft Windows and Xbox Live Arcade on January 12, 2011. The word "Zeit" is German for time.

Gameplay
Zeit² is a traditional side-scrolling, 2D, shoot 'em up game with a unique gameplay mechanic that allows players to move forward and backward in time, making it possible for the player to combine shots and power, and even be assisted by a shadow version of the player.

The game features seventy challenges and eight bosses, as well as six game modes, including Score Attack, Survival, Wave, Time Limit and Tactics.

History
Zeit² was within the Top 20 of Microsoft Dream Build Play 2008, an Independent Games Festival 2009 Student Showcase Finalist and Indie Game Challenge 2010 Finalist.

Reception

Zeit² received "average" reviews on both platforms according to the review aggregation website Metacritic.

References

External links
Official developer site
Xbox LIVE Marketplace profile

2011 video games
Microsoft XNA games
Scrolling shooters
Video games about time travel
Ubisoft games
Video games developed in Germany
Windows games
Xbox 360 Live Arcade games

Single-player video games